The Roman Catholic Diocese of Kerema is  a suffragan diocese of the Roman Catholic Archdiocese of Port Moresby. It was erected in 1971 from separated parts of the Dioceses of Bereina and Mendi.

Bishops

Ordinaries
Virgil Patrick Copas, M.S.C. (1976–1988), Archbishop (personal title) 
Paul John Marx, M.S.C. (1988–2010)
Patrick Taval, M.S.C. (2010-2013)
Pedro Centeno Baquero, S.D.B. (2017-)

Coadjutor bishops
Paul John Marx, M.S.C. (1985-1988)
Patrick Taval, M.S.C. (2007-2010)

Auxiliary bishop
Rochus Josef Tatamai, M.S.C.  (2005–2007), appointed Bishop of Bereina

External links and references

Kerema